Selwyn County may  refer to:
 Selwyn County, New South Wales, Australia
 Selwyn County, New Zealand